The next Quebec Liberal Party leadership election will be held to elect a new leader to replace Dominique Anglade, who announced her resignation on November 7, 2022 amid mounting criticism within the party for her performance in the 2022 Quebec general election and for her subsequent decision to remove Liberal MNA Marie-Claude Nichols that saw her removed from caucus. Anglade had led the party to losses in the election held a month earlier, finishing with only 21 seats and 14% of the popular vote, their lowest seat count since 1956 and their lowest share of the popular vote in their history; while the party remained the official opposition, they fell behind the governing Coalition Avenir Québec and opposition Parti Québécois and Québec solidaire to place fourth in the popular vote.

Candidates

Expressed Interest
Joël Lightbound, MP for Louis-Hébert (2015–present).

Potential candidates
Pierre Arcand, Interim Leader of the Quebec Liberal Party and Leader of the Official Opposition (2018–2020), President of the Treasury Board (2017–2018), Minister of Energy and Natural Resources (2014–2017), Minister for Environment, Sustainable Development and Parks (2010–2012), Minister of International Relations and La Francophonie (2008–2010), MNA for Mont-Royal and Mont-Royal–Outremont (2008–2022).
Gaétan Barrette, Minister of Health and Social Services (2014–2018), MNA for La Pinière (2014–2022).
Sophie Brochu, President and CEO of Hydro-Québec (2020–present).
François-Philippe Champagne, federal Minister of Innovation, Science and Industry (2021–present), Minister of Foreign Affairs (2019–2021), Minister of Infrastructure and Communities (2018–2019), Minister of International Trade (2017–2018), MP for Saint-Maurice—Champlain (2015–present).
Denis Coderre, Mayor of Montreal (2013–2017), federal President of the Queen's Privy Council for Canada (2003–2004), Minister of Citizenship and Immigration (2002–2003), Secretary of State (Amateur Sport) (1999–2002), MP for Bourassa (1997–2013).
Alexandre Cusson, Mayor of Drummondville (2013–2020), President of the l'Union des municipalités du Québec (2017-2019).
Monsef Derraji, MNA for Nelligan (2018–present).
André Fortin, Minister of Transport, Sustainable Mobility and Transport Electrification (2017–2018), MNA for Pontiac (2014–present).
Alain Rayes, MP for Richmond—Arthabaska (2015–present).
Marwah Rizqy, MNA for Saint-Laurent (2018–present).
Marc Tanguay, Interim Leader of the Quebec Liberal Party and Leader of the Official Opposition (2022–present), MNA for LaFontaine (2012–present).

Declined
Karl Blackburn, Director General of the Quebec Liberal Party (2009–2013), MNA for Roberval (2003–2007).
Mario Dumont, Leader of the Action Démocratique du Québec (1994–2009), Leader of the Official Opposition (2007–2008), MNA for Rivière-du-Loup (1994–2009).
Sam Hamad, President of the Treasury Board (2016), Minister of Labour, Employment and Social Solidarity (2015–2016), Minister of Labour (2014–2015), Ministry of Economic Development, Innovation and Export Trade (2011–2012), Minister of Transport (2010–2011), Minister of Labour (2009–2010), Minister of Employment and Social Solidarity (2007–2010), Minister of Natural Resources, Wildlife and Parks (2003–2005), MNA for Louis-Hébert (2003–2017). Endorsed Moreau.
Pierre Moreau, Minister of Energy and Natural Resources (2017–2018), President of the Treasury Board (2017), Minister of Education, Recreation and Sports (2016), Minister of Municipal Affairs and Land Occupancy (2014–2016), Minister of Transport (2011–2012), Minister responsible for Canadian Intergovernmental Affairs and the Canadian Francophonie (2011), MNA for Marguerite-D'Youville (2003–2007) and Châteauguay (2008–2018).

Opinion polling

Liberal supporters

All Quebecers

References

See also
Quebec Liberal Party leadership elections

Leadership conventions
Future elections in Canada